Suppressor of cytokine signaling 1 is a protein that in humans is encoded by the SOCS1 gene. SOCS1 orthologs have been identified in several mammals for which complete genome data are available.

Function 

This gene encodes a member of the STAT-induced STAT inhibitor (SSI), also known as suppressor of cytokine signalling (SOCS), family. SSI family members are cytokine-inducible negative regulators of cytokine signaling. The expression of this gene can be induced by a subset of cytokines, including IL2, IL3 erythropoietin (EPO), GM-CSF, and interferon-gamma (IFN-γ). The protein encoded by this gene functions downstream of cytokine receptors, and takes part in a negative feedback loop to attenuate cytokine signaling. Knockout studies in mice suggested the role of this gene as a modulator of IFN-γ action, which is required for normal postnatal growth and survival.

Several recent viral studies have shown that viral genes, such as Tax gene product (Tax), encoded by HTLV-1, could hijack SOCS1 to inhibit host antiviral pathways, as a strategy to evade host immunity.

Interactions 
The suppressor of cytokine signaling 1 has been shown to interact with:

 Tax, 
 CD117, 
 Colony stimulating factor 1 receptor 
 Growth hormone receptor, 
 IRS2, 
 Janus kinase 2,  and
 TEC.

See also 
SOCS
JAK-STAT signaling pathway

References

Further reading 

 
 
 
 
 
 
 
 
 
 
 
 
 
 
 
 
 
 
 

Cell signaling
Signal transduction